This is a list of home video releases (VHS and DVD) of Dora the Explorer.

VHS releases
Nickelodeon and Paramount produced a number of VHS releases.

DVD releases
Nickelodeon produced a number of DVDs based on the show, with Paramount for Region 1; and with Universal / Sony for Region 4.

DVD releases with episode collections, including Dora the Explorer

With Paramount for Region 1 and with Universal/Sony for Region 4, Nickelodeon released a number of DVDs featuring one episode from a variety of the animated television series they have produced besides Dora the Explorer, including The Backyardigans, Blue's Clues, Blue's Room, Bubble Guppies, The Fresh Beat Band, Go, Diego, Go!, Jack's Big Music Show, LazyTown, Little Bill, Max & Ruby, Mutt & Stuff, Ni Hao, Kai-lan, Oswald, PAW Patrol, Team Umizoomi, Wonder Pets!, and Yo Gabba Gabba!, usually 6 on each DVD.

Bonus episodes of Dora the Explorer on other Nickelodeon Series DVD Releases
Dora the Explorer episodes featured as bonus episodes in the DVD releases of other animated television series that Nickelodeon produced, primarily with Universal/Sony for Region 4, including Go Diego Go!.

Game Boy Advance (GBA) Video releases 

There was only one Nickelodeon GBA Pak, through the short-lived GBA-Cartridge format, released with Dora the Explorer episodes.

See also
 List of Dora the Explorer episodes

References

Home video releases
Lists of home video releases